The 325th Infantry Division is a division of the People's Army of Vietnam (PAVN), first formed in March 1951 from independent units in Thừa Thiên, it is likely that it only became fully operational in mid-1952. It was one of the 6 original "Iron and Steel" Divisions of the Viet Minh.

First Indochina War
In December 1953 the 325th took part in the Viet Minh probe into Laos.

In late December 1953 seven battalions from Regiment 101 of the 325th and Regiment 66 of the 304th Division moving from Vinh attacked isolated French outposts in the Annamite Range in Annam and Central Laos.

Vietnam War
In early 1961 the Division was sent to Laos to support Pathet Lao forces and on 11 April captured Tchepone. This secured an essential area for the expansion of the Ho Chi Minh Trail.

The Division's 95th Regiment arrived in Kon Tum Province in December 1964. In February 1965 the 95th was joined by the 101st Regiment.

U.S intelligence indicated that the 325C Division was operating in the Vietnamese Demilitarized Zone by July 1967.

On 3 February 1968, a battalion of the 325C attacked the Marines on Hill 861A north of Khe Sanh Combat Base, the attack was repulsed with 7 Marines and 109 PAVN killed. On the night of 6/7 February, the 101st Regiment and the 22nd Regiment (attached to the 304th Division), supported by 12 PT-76 lights tanks of the 203rd Armored Regiment overran the US special forces camp at Lang Vei killing 316 of the camp's defenders including seven Americans for the loss of 90 PAVN killed and seven tanks destroyed. On 8 February a reinforced Battalion of the 101st Regiment attacked a 9th Marines' position west of the Combat Base, 21 Marines and 150 PAVN were killed.

On 12 July 1972 the Division together with the 312th Division was sent to support the Second Battle of Quảng Trị.

On 15 May 1974 the Division's 95th Regiment attacked Dak Pek Camp overrunning one of the last Army of the Republic of Vietnam (ARVN) bases on Route 14.

On 17 May 1974 PAVN 2nd Corps was formed comprising the Division, the 304th and 324th Divisions, the 673rd Air Defense Division, the 164th Artillery Brigade, the 203rd tank Brigade, the 219th Engineer Brigade and the 463rd Signal Regiment under the command of Major General Hoàng Văn Thái.

As part of the Hue-Da Nang Campaign on 19 March the Division and the 324th Division attacked the ARVN 1st Division and the 15th Ranger Group along Route 1 south of Huế. On the afternoon of 22 March the 324th pushed the 15th Rangers out of Phú Lộc cutting Route 1 and forcing the ARVN forces to withdraw back to a defensive line around Phu Bai Combat Base On 24 March all ARVN forces were ordered to abandon Huế and regroup in Danang, a disorganised seaborne evacuation followed and by 25 March the PAVN was in control of the city.

For the attack on Danang, by 26 March the Division advanced from the north, the 9th Regiment of the 304th was located northwest of Danang, while the rest of the 304th and 711th Divisions encircled from the south and the 3rd Regiment of the 324th was located southwest of the city. By the afternoon of 29 March the 2nd Corps had penetrated the ARVN defences and entered the city which finally fell on 31 March.

On 16 April the Division's 101st Regiment captured Phan Rang and then after defeating several ARVN counterattacks captured Phan Rang Air Base. On 18 April the Division's 18th Regiment captured Phan Thiết.

By 26 April the Division and the 304th Division were attacking Route 15, the last overland link between Saigon and Vung Tau. On 29 April the Division attacked Nhơn Trạch District, Thuy Ha and Cat Lai southwest of Saigon.

Present Day
Today the division remains part of the 2nd Corps.

References

Infantry divisions of Vietnam
Divisions of the People's Army of Vietnam
Military units and formations established in 1951
1951 establishments in Vietnam